Bazlul Karim Falu was a Bangladeshi politician. He was a freedom fighter. He was elected as MP of Kishoreganj-1 constituency in 1988. He died on 20 April 2019 at the age of 68.

References

Bangladesh Nationalist Party politicians
People from Kishoreganj District
4th Jatiya Sangsad members
1950s births
2019 deaths
Bengali politicians
People of the Bangladesh Liberation War